Jorge Luis Almaguer Ruíz (born March 2, 1994, in León, Guanajuato), known as Jorge Almaguer, is a Mexican professional association football (soccer) player who plays for Colima

References

External links
 

1994 births
Living people
Mexican footballers
Association football midfielders
Atlético ECCA footballers
Club Celaya footballers
Irapuato F.C. footballers
Loros UdeC footballers
Potros UAEM footballers
Coras de Nayarit F.C. footballers
Ascenso MX players
Liga Premier de México players
Tercera División de México players
Footballers from Guanajuato
Sportspeople from León, Guanajuato